Chattogram Polytechnic Institute,
 is a government technical institution located in the port city of Chittagong, Bangladesh. It provides theoretical and practical education of basic engineering and technology. Chittagong Polytechnic Institute was established in 1962. It is one of the best public polytechnic institutes in Bangladesh.

Academics

Departments 
Currently there are seven technologies/departments. These are:
 Faculty of Civil Engineering
 Department of Civil Engineering
 Department of Environmental Engineering
 Faculty of Mechanical Engineering
 Department of Mechanical Engineering
 Faculty of Electrical and Electronic Engineering
 Department of Electrical Engineering
 Department of Electronics Engineering
 Department of Power Engineering
Faculty of Computer Science and Engineering
Department of Computer Science and Engineering

Information 
The Chittagong Polytechnic Institute contributes a lot to the Diploma in Engineering job sector in Bangladesh. It is situated on 35 acres of land in Nasirabad, Chittagong.
It is equipped with professional instructors and quality laboratory instruments. It has classified labs, such as a basic electronics lab, advanced electronics lab, computer labs, chemistry lab, and physics lab. It has workshops for practical education, such as metal shop, wood shop, power shop, and basic workshop.
The Chittagong Polytechnic Institute has a group of Rover Scouts.
Every year many students enrolls in CPI, and many pass as a diploma Engineer
Each of CPI's departments is divided into eight semesters. In each semester a student earns a significant amount of CGPA under 4 or equal. The last semester is the Industrial Training Semester. A student learns practical information about a selected technology in an industry for approximately six months.
In the Chittagong Polytechnic Institute, 65% of the students of each semester receive scholarships from the Government. The World Bank also gives a significant number of scholarships to selected students.

Halls of residence 
Master da Surya Sen Hall
Kobi Kazi Nazrul Islam Hall
Nabab Seraz u dullaha Hall
Dr. Shohidullaha Hall
Pritilata Hall(for Girls)

Notable alumni 
A. B. M. Mohiuddin Chowdhury - Bangladeshi Politician and Former Mayor of Chittagong

Gallery

See also 
 Bangladesh Technical Education Board
 Dhaka Polytechnic Institute
 Kushtia Polytechnic Institute
 Bangladesh Sweden Polytechnic Institute
 Shyamoli Ideal Polytechnic Institute

References

External links 
 Chittagong Polytechnic Institute
 Official Website

Polytechnic institutes in Bangladesh
Educational institutions established in 1962
1960s establishments in East Pakistan